Grant Davies (born 11 September 1963) is an Australian sprint canoeist who competed in the late 1980s. At the 1988 Summer Olympics in Seoul, he won a silver medal in the K-1 1000 m event.  He was initially told that he had won the gold medal, but 11 minutes after the race the officials declared that Greg Barton had won the race by 0.005 seconds, the narrowest margin in Olympic history.

In 2009 Davies was inducted into the Queensland Sport Hall of Fame.

References

1963 births
Australian male canoeists
Canoeists at the 1988 Summer Olympics
Living people
Olympic canoeists of Australia
Olympic silver medalists for Australia
Olympic medalists in canoeing
Sportsmen from Queensland
Medalists at the 1988 Summer Olympics
20th-century Australian people